Russell T. Thane (July 14, 1926 – November 10, 2020) was an American politician who was a member of the North Dakota State Senate. He represented the 25th district from 1971 to 2006 as a member of the Republican party. He was an alumnus of the North Dakota State College of Science, North Dakota State University and Rutgers University Eagleton Institution of Politics. Thane was a farmer and  resided in Wahpeton, North Dakota.

References

1926 births
2020 deaths
North Dakota State College of Science alumni
North Dakota State University alumni
Rutgers University alumni
People from Denver
People from Wahpeton, North Dakota
Presidents pro tempore of the North Dakota Senate
Republican Party North Dakota state senators